Viņas melo labāk ('They [females] Lie Better') is a Latvian summer daytime soap opera broadcast by TV3 Latvia. It is one of the longest-running serial with 10 seasons and with well-known Latvian actors – Andris Bullis, Lauris Reiniks, Evija Skulte, Karīna Tatarinova etc.

The show was created by Sigita Račka and Rimvīds Martinaitis and after the first four weeks of the series, “Viņas melo labāk” achieved incredible success on TV screens and on video platform and application and it was watched by 784,000 Latvian residents.

On May 27, 2019, the show's seventh season began being aired on Mondays through Thursdays.

History 
The first series of soap opera “Viņas melo labāk” began on July, 2013 which was broadcast on TV3 Latvia. At the time, “Viņas melo labāk” was the only daytime soap opera after “UgunsGrēks” ended on TV3 Latvia. “Viņas melo labāk” new series airs each summer on weekdays.

Storyline 
When Viņas melo labāk began in 2013, the TV series was about the lonely Kristīne, who is single, her friend Marta, who has been married, but spends time with other men, workaholic Margo, and Jolanta, who came to Riga from a small town in search of happiness. The women encounter unexpected adventures when many other characters join the soap opera. Within the first four weeks of the series, “Viņas melo labāk” achieved success on TV screens and on video streaming platforms and applications after it became watched by 784,000 Latvian residents.

Cast 
In the first season of “Viņas melo labāk,” there were four main female characters – Marta, Margarita, Jolanta and Kristīne. In season 6, there were 30 characters. In 5 years, including the current characters, there have been 47 actors who have appeared on this soap opera, including the well-known Latvian singer and actor Lauris Reiniks.

Executive production and head writing team 
Director – Sigita Račka

Producer – Rimvīds Martinaitis

Assistant – Gatis Upesleja

TV Operators – Sandris Polis and Igors Stāds

Sound engineer – Ainars Ašmanis

Costume and make-up artist – Kristīne Anderosne

Theme song 
Each season has started with the title song “Meitenes vēl pasakām tic” (“Girls Still believe in Fairy Tales”). The song is composed by Lithuanian composer Žilvins Lili, written by Guntars Račs, arranged by Gints Stankevičs and performed by Latvian singers Ieva Karēvica and IGO (Rodrigo Fomins).

External links 
 https://tvplay.skaties.lv/vinas-melo-labak/1396/episode/

References 

2010s Latvian television series
TV3 (Latvia) original programming